Vanderbilt University Law School (also known as VLS) is a graduate school of Vanderbilt University. Established in 1874, it is one of the oldest law schools in the southern United States. Vanderbilt Law School has consistently ranked among the top 20 law schools in the nation. It is ranked 5th on Above the Law's 2022 Top Law School Rankings and 16th in the 2022 edition of U.S. News & World Report.

Vanderbilt Law School is one of the most selective law schools in the United States and has a 14.25% acceptance rate. Vanderbilt Law enrolls approximately 640 students, with each entering Juris Doctor class consisting of approximately 175 students.

The dean of the law school is Chris Guthrie, who began his third five-year appointment as dean on July 1, 2019.

According to Vanderbilt Law School's 2020 ABA-required disclosures, 84.44% of the Class of 2020 obtained full-time, long-term, bar examination passage-required employment nine months after graduation, excluding solo practitioners.

History

Vanderbilt Law School was established in 1874, and was the first professional school to open (Vanderbilt University itself did not start its undergraduate classes until 1875). The law school's first class consisted of only seven students and eight professors, with a two-year course of study comprising the school's curriculum. William V. Sullivan was the school's first graduate and would eventually represent Mississippi in the United States Senate. William Frierson Cooper, who had been nominated by Jefferson Davis to serve on the Supreme Court of the Confederate States of America, served as the first dean from 1874 to 1875. He was succeeded by Thomas H. Malone, a veteran of the Confederate States Army, who served as dean from 1875 to 1904.

Through the late 19th and early 20th centuries, the law school remained small, never exceeding 70 students. The law school offered a two-year departmental program, and changed locations between downtown Nashville and the Vanderbilt campus. By 1941, it had expanded into the old chapel area of Kirkland Hall on the Vanderbilt campus, but faced very limited enrollment during World War II. Classes were suspended in 1944.

Vanderbilt Law School was revived with a $1 million endowment in 1947 and experienced significant growth through the 1960s. Facing overcrowding, in 1962, it moved out of Kirkland Hall and into a dedicated law school building on 21st Avenue South, where it is still located.

Since then, VLS has undergone a series of renovations and expansion, notably including a $24 million upgrade under then-dean Kent D. Syverud completed in 2002.

By 2000, VLS had established a Law & Business Program, new clinical programs, multiple law journals, and an LL.M. program for foreign lawyers. At this point, Vanderbilt had greatly solidified its regional prestige and was well on its way to aggressively developing a national reputation.

In 2005, Edward L. Rubin was appointed to replace Syverud as dean of the law school. During Dean Rubin's tenure, Vanderbilt Law School significantly developed its Litigation & Dispute and Resolution Program (resulting from a $2.9 million endowment donation), established or formalized a number of academic programs, and increased its reputation in the field of Law and Economics by establishing a Ph.D. Program in Law and Economics based within the law school and headed by noted economist W. Kip Viscusi; students earn both a J.D. and a Ph.D. through the program.

Chris Guthrie succeeded Rubin as the law school's dean in July 2009. In addition to its Law and Business and Litigation and Dispute Resolution Programs, the law school now offers programs in Intellectual Property Law; International Legal Studies; Energy, Environment and Land Use Law; Criminal Justice; Social Justice; and Law and Government. Vanderbilt University and the law school also offers a joint-degree law and neuroscience program in which students earn both a J.D. and Ph.D., and the school introduced a joint-degree J.D./M.S. in Finance in conjunction with Vanderbilt's Owen Graduate School of Management in fall 2014.

Culture
The total enrollment of students pursuing either a Juris Doctor (J.D) or LL.M. is approximately 640.  The program usually enrolls no more than 175 students to the J.D. class, and approximately 50 students to the LL.M class each year. VLS has more than 45 student organizations, which support many lectures, presentations and social events throughout the year. Students are also encouraged to form new organizations tailored to their personal interests, which has most recently produced Law Students for Social Justice (LSSJ), a new organization within the Social Justice Program that aims to facilitate an increasing number of students interested in pursuing public interest careers or hearing from legal practitioners on various ways to implement social justice values into their practice.

Programs

Vanderbilt's upper-level concentration programs allow students to earn a certificate in Law & Business as well as concentrate their studies in such fields as international law, intellectual property law; litigation and dispute resolution; energy, environmental and land use law; criminal law and social justice. In 2005, the Cecil D. Branstetter Litigation & Dispute Resolution Program received a $2.9 million endowment through a cy pres settlement of a class action lawsuit. Vanderbilt also has programs that allow students to focus on intellectual property law; energy, environmental and land use law; international and comparative law; criminal justice; and social justice. In fall 2011, Vanderbilt University received a $4.85 million grant from the John D. and Catherine T. MacArthur Foundation for the establishment of a national MacArthur Foundation Research Network on Law and Neuroscience.

Vanderbilt's Ph.D. Program in Law & Economics was the first program of its kind in the nation. The program, which is directed by economists W. Kip Viscusi and Joni Hersch, admitted its first class in fall 2007 and graduated its first student, Jennifer Bennett Shinall, in 2012. Shinall joined Vanderbilt's Law and Economics faculty in fall 2014.

Vanderbilt Law School also offers a summer study program, Vanderbilt in Venice, which is open to students from all accredited law schools and offers courses in comparative and international law. While classes in the program are held in Venice, Italy, the faculty include members of the Vanderbilt Law School faculty as well as faculty from the Ca' Foscari University of Venice. Past courses included Transnational Litigation, Counter-Terrorism Law, European Union Law, and Comparative Environmental Regulation.

Post-graduation employment

According to Vanderbilt Law School's official 2013 ABA-required disclosures, 85.9% of the Class of 2013 obtained full-time, long-term, bar passage-required employment nine months after graduation, excluding solo-practitioners. Vanderbilt Law School ranked 12th out of the 201 ABA-approved law schools in terms of the percentage of 2013 graduates with non-school-funded, full-time, long-term, bar passage required jobs nine months after graduation.

Vanderbilt Law School's Law School Transparency under-employment score is 6.3%, indicating the percentage of the Class of 2013 unemployed, pursuing an additional degree, or working in a non-professional, short-term, or part-time job nine months after graduation. 94.2% of the Class of 2013 was employed in some capacity while 1% were pursuing graduate degrees and 3.9% were unemployed nine months graduation.

Vanderbilt Law School is currently the 10th best law school for securing federal clerkships, with 10% of its recent graduates having secured such positions. In 2017 and in 2018, recent Vanderbilt Law graduates have clerked for Justices Clarence Thomas and Sonia Sotomayor of the Supreme Court of the United States, respectively.

Costs
The total cost of attendance (indicating the cost of tuition, fees, and living expenses) at Vanderbilt Law for the 2020-21 academic year is $92,004.

The Law School Transparency estimated debt-financed cost of attendance for three years is $270,165.

Publications
The Vanderbilt Law Review is ranked 18th among general-topic law reviews, based upon the number of times its articles are cited. Other journals are the Vanderbilt Journal of Transnational Law, founded in 1967, and the Vanderbilt Journal of Entertainment and Technology Law, founded as the Journal of Entertainment Law and Practice in 1998.

The Environmental Law and Policy Annual Review, a joint publication with the Environmental Law Institute, debuted in 2008. ELPAR is released each year as the August issue of the Environmental Law Reporter, one of the most widely circulated environmental law publications in the country.

Notable alumni

Attorneys
 Lawrence Barcella (J.D. 1970), criminal defense lawyer, Assistant United States Attorney for the District of Columbia, lead counsel for the House October Surprise Task Force
 Lucius E. Burch Jr. (J.D. 1936), American attorney, best known for his contributions to conservation and civil rights, and attorney for Martin Luther King Jr.
 Donald Q. Cochran (J.D. 1992), United States Attorney for the United States District Court for the Middle District of Tennessee
 Bobby Lee Cook, defense attorney, inspiration for the television series Matlock main character Ben Matlock, which starred Andy Griffith as a Georgia attorney.
 Zachary T. Fardon (J.D. 1992), United States Attorney for the Northern District of Illinois, U.S. Attorney in Chicago, appointed by Barack Obama
 Margie Pitts Hames (J.D. 1961), American civil rights lawyer who argued the abortion rights case Doe v. Bolton before the U.S. Supreme Court
 John Jay Hooker (J.D. 1957), American lawyer, entrepreneur, political gadfly, special assistant to Robert F. Kennedy
 Robert J. Kabel (J.D. 1972), attorney and lobbyist with Faegre Baker Daniels LLP, involved in developing the Gramm–Leach–Bliley Act (1999) and the Dodd-Frank Act (2010)
 Charles M. La Follette (J.D.), Deputy Chief of Counsel for the post-World War II Nuremberg Trials (1947)
 Emmett McAuliffe (J.D. 1983), American intellectual property and entertainment lawyer 
 James F. Neal (J.D. 1957), trial lawyer, Watergate prosecutor who prosecuted Jimmy Hoffa and top officials of the Nixon Administration, special investigator of the Abscam and Iran-contra scandals
 John Randolph Neal Jr. (LL.B 1896), American attorney, best known for his role as chief counsel during the 1925 Scopes trial 
 Neil Papiano (LL.B 1961), American lawyer, and managing partner of Iverson, Yoakum, Papiano & Hatch
 Sam C. Pointer Jr. (A.B. 1955), attorney in Birmingham, Alabama and a United States district judge for Northern Alabama, noted figure in complex multidistrict class-action litigation
 William Bradford Reynolds (LL.B 1967), Assistant Attorney General in charge of the US Department of Justice's Civil Rights Division (1981–1988)
 Ronald J. Rychlak (J.D. 1983), Order of the Coif, adviser of the Holy See to the United Nations, delegate of the Assembly of States Parties to the International Criminal Court
 Hans von Spakovsky (J.D. 1984), attorney, former member of the Federal Election Commission (FEC), manager of the Heritage Foundation's Election Law Reform Initiative
 Tom Tait (J.D. 1985), CEO of Tait & Associates, Inc. and Tait Environmental Services, Inc.
 Jack Thompson (J.D. 1976), Vanderbilt Law School, disbarred attorney and activist against obscenity and violence in media and entertainment
 Horace Henry White (LL.B 1887), American lawyer, authored legal volumes White's Notarial Guide and White's Analytical Index.
 Walton J. Wood, American attorney and jurist who served as the first public defender in United States history (1914–1921)

Jurists
 Tamara W. Ashford (J.D. 1994), Article I judge of the United States Tax Court
 Jennings Bailey (LL.B 1890), judge of the United States District Court for the District of Columbia
 Jeffrey S. Bivins (J.D. 1986), Chief Justice of the Supreme Court of Tennessee
 Claria Horn Boom (J.D. 1994), United States district judge of the United States District Court for Eastern and Western Kentucky
 John P. Bourcier (J.D. 1953), former Justice of the Rhode Island Supreme Court
 Cornelia Clark (J.D. 1979), Justice of the Tennessee Supreme Court
 Waverly D. Crenshaw Jr. (J.D. 1981), Chief Judge of the United States District Court for the Middle District of Tennessee
 Martha Craig Daughtrey (J.D. 1968), senior United States circuit judge of the United States Court of Appeals for the Sixth Circuit
 Frank Drowota (B.A. 1960, J.D. 1965), former Chief Justice of the Tennessee Supreme Court
 Eric Eisnaugle (J.D. 2003), Judge of the Florida Fifth District Court of Appeal
 Oscar Richard Hundley (LL.B 1877), Judge of the United States District Court for the Northern District of Alabama
 Edwin Hunt, appellate advocate, Assistant Attorney General, U.S. checkers champion (1934)
 William Joseph Haynes Jr. (J.D. 1973), former United States district judge of the United States District Court for the Middle District of Tennessee
 Thomas Aquinas Higgins (LL.B 1957), United States district judge of the United States District Court for the Middle District of Tennessee
 John W. Holland (LL.B 1906), former United States district judge of the United States District Court for the Southern District of Florida
 Jeremy Kernodle (J.D. 2001), United States district judge of the United States District Court for the Eastern District of Texas
 William C. Koch Jr. (J.D. 1972), former Justice of the Supreme Court of Tennessee
 W. H. Kornegay (LL.B 1890), Oklahoma Supreme Court justice (1931–1932), delegate to Oklahoma Constitutional Convention
 James C. Mahan (J.D. 1973), senior United States district judge of the United States District Court for the District of Nevada
 Gilbert S. Merritt Jr. (LL.B 1960), lawyer and jurist, senior United States circuit judge of the United States Court of Appeals for the Sixth Circuit
 Jon Phipps McCalla (J.D. 1974), senior United States district judge of the United States District Court for the Western District of Tennessee
 Leon Clarence McCord (Law, 1900), senior United States circuit judge of the United States Court of Appeals for the Fifth Circuit
 Travis Randall McDonough (J.D. 1997), United States district judge of the United States District Court for the Eastern District of Tennessee 
 Benjamin K. Miller (J.D. 1961), former Chief Justice of the Illinois Supreme Court
 Brian Stacy Miller (J.D. 1995), Chief United States district judge of the United States District Court for the Eastern District of Arkansas
 John Musmanno (J.D. 1966), senior judge of the Pennsylvania Superior Court
 John Trice Nixon (LL.B 1960), senior United States district judge of the United States District Court for the Middle District of Tennessee
 Tom Parker (J.D.), Chief Justice of the Alabama Supreme Court 
 Tommy Parker (J.D. 1989), United States district judge of the United States District Court for the Western District of Tennessee
 Marlin T. Phelps (J.D.), former Chief Justice of the Supreme Court of Arizona
 Thomas W. Phillips (J.D. 1969), senior United States district judge of the United States District Court for the Eastern District of Tennessee
 Jonathan Pittman (J.D. 1990), Associate Judge of the Superior Court of the District of Columbia
 Kevin H. Sharp (J.D. 1993), United States district judge of the United States District Court for the Middle District of Tennessee 
 Sarah Hicks Stewart (J.D. 1992), Associate Justice of the Supreme Court of Alabama
 Jane Branstetter Stranch (J.D. 1978), Order of the Coif, United States circuit judge of the United States Court of Appeals for the Sixth Circuit
 Aleta Arthur Trauger (M.A. 1972), United States district judge of the United States District Court for the Middle District of Tennessee
 Thomas A. Varlan (J.D. 1981), Chief United States district judge of the United States District Court for the Eastern District of Tennessee
 Roger Vinson (J.D. 1971), senior United States district judge of the United States District Court for the Northern District of Florida, former member of the United States Foreign Intelligence Surveillance Court.
 Samuel Cole Williams (LL.B 1884), noted 19th and 20th century Tennessee jurist, historian, educator, and businessman
 Billy Roy Wilson (J.D. 1965), senior United States district judge of the United States District Court for the Eastern District of Arkansas
 Thomas A. Wiseman Jr. (J.D. 1954), senior judge of the United States District Court for the Middle District of Tennessee
 Staci Michelle Yandle (J.D. 1987), United States district judge of the United States District Court for the Southern District of Illinois
 Harry W. Wellford (LL.B 1950), senior United States circuit judge of the United States Court of Appeals for the Sixth Circuit

Government

U.S. vice presidents
 John Nance Garner (Law, 1886), 32nd vice president of the United States and 39th Speaker of the United States House of Representatives
Al Gore, (Law, 1974-1976), 45th vice president of the United States, United States Senator, United States representative, and 2000 Democratic Party presidential nominee.

Members of the Cabinet and federal agencies
 Bill Corr (J.D.), Chief of Staff for the Secretary of Health and Human Services, Deputy Secretary of the HHS
 James Danly (J.D. 2013), Commissioner of the Federal Energy Regulatory Commission
 Phyllis Fong (J.D. 1978), Inspector General of the United States Department of Agriculture
 Vince Foster, former Deputy White House Chief of Staff
 J. Christopher Giancarlo (J.D. 1984), former Chairman of the United States Commodity Futures Trading Commission (CFTC)
 E. William Henry (J.D. 1957), Federal Communications Commission Chairman (1963–1966)
 Robert L. King (J.D. 1971), Assistant Secretary of Education, serving as head of the Office of Postsecondary Education
 Paul C. Ney Jr. (JD, MBA 1984), General Counsel of the Department of Defense of the United States 
 Stephen D. Potts (LL.B 1954), 4th Director of the United States Office of Government Ethics
 Hans von Spakovsky (J.D. 1984), Federal Election Commission commissioner
 Gordon O. Tanner (J.D. 1973), General Counsel of the Air Force

U.S. governors
 Greg Abbott (J.D. 1984), 48th governor of Texas
 Theodore Bilbo (Law, 1900), 39th and 43rd governor of Mississippi (1916-1920; 1928-1932)
 Frank G. Clement (LL.B 1942), 41st governor of Tennessee (1963–1967)
 Lee Cruce (Law, 1885), 2nd governor of Oklahoma (1911–1915)
 Jeff Davis (Law, 1882), 20th governor of Arkansas (1901–1907)
 Joseph W. Folk (LL.B 1890), 31st governor of Missouri (1905–1909)
 Hill McAlister (LL.B 1897), 34th governor of Tennessee (1933–1937)
 Malcolm R. Patterson (Law, 1882), 30th governor of Tennessee (1907–1911)

U.S. senators
 Theodore Bilbo (Law, 1900), United States senator from Mississippi (1935–1947)
 Jeff Davis (LL.B 1881), United States senator from Arkansas (1907–1913)
 Duncan U. Fletcher (LL.B 1880), United States senator from Florida (1909–1936)
 Bill Hagerty (B.A. 1981, J.D. 1984) – United States senator from Tennessee (2021– )
 Jim Sasser (LL.B 1961), United States senator from Tennessee (1977–1995)
 William V. Sullivan (LL.B 1875), United States senator from Mississippi (1898–1901)
 Fred Dalton Thompson (J.D. 1967), United States senator from Tennessee (1994–2003)

Members of the U.S. House of Representatives
 William Vollie Alexander, Jr. (J.D. 1960), United States representative from Arkansas (1969–1993)
 John L. Burnett (Law 1876), United States representative from Alabama (1899–1919)
 Jo Byrns (LL.B 1882), 41st Speaker of the United States House of Representatives
 Joseph W. Byrns Jr. (J.D. 1928), United States representative from Tennessee (1938–1941)
 William Wirt Hastings (J.D. 1889), United States representative from Oklahoma (1915–1921)
 Henderson M. Jacoway (J.D. 1898), United States representative from Arkansas (1911–1923)
 Joseph T. Johnson (LL.B 1883), United States representative from South Carolina (1901–1915)
 Ric Keller (J.D. 1992), United States representative from Florida (2001–2009)
 Charles M. La Follette (J.D.), United States representative from Indiana (1943–1947)
 Leonard Lance (J.D. 1977), United States representative from New Jersey (2009- )
 Fritz G. Lanham (Law, 1897–98), United States representative from Texas (1919–1947)
 Oscar Lovette (J.D. 1896), United States representative from Tennessee (1931–1933)
 Luke Messer (J.D. 1994), United States representative from Indiana (2013- )
 Malcolm R. Patterson (Law, 1882), United States representative from Tennessee (1901–1906)
 Ben Quayle (J.D. 2002), United States representative from Arizona (2011–2013)
 Frazier Reams (J.D. 1922), United States representative from Ohio (1951–1955)
 Charles C. Reid (J.D. 1887), United States representative from Arkansas (1901–1911)
 John Rose (J.D. 1993), United States representative from Tennessee (2019- )
 Joseph E. Washington (LL.B 1874), United States representative from Tennessee (1887–1897)

U.S. ambassadors and diplomats
 Alvin P. Adams Jr. (J.D.), former American diplomat, United States ambassador to Peru, Haiti, and Djibouti
 Thomas C. Ferguson (J.D. 1959), former United States ambassador to Brunei
 William Hagerty (J.D. 1984), 30th United States ambassador to Japan
 Jim Sasser (J.D. 1961), United States ambassador to China under the Clinton administration

Other U.S. state officials
 Bruce Bennett (J.D. 1949), 38th Arkansas attorney general
 Lance Cargill (J.D. 1996), lawyer and former speaker of the Oklahoma House of Representatives
 Riley Darnell (J.D. 1965), Tennessee secretary of state
 Neria Douglass (J.D. 1977), 50th Maine State Treasurer
 Steve Freudenthal (J.D. 1975), 28th attorney general of Wyoming
 Bill Gibbons (J.D.), Memphis district attorney
 Douglas Henry (J.D. 1951), member of the Tennessee Senate representing the 21st district, activist
 Roy Herron (J.D. 1980), former chairman of the Tennessee Democratic Party
 Robert L. King (J.D.), former Monroe County, New York executive, former chancellor of the State University of New York
 William Harding Mayes (LL.B 1881), lieutenant governor of Texas
 J. Washington Moore (LL.B 1891), Eminent Supreme Archon of Sigma Alpha Epsilon, 1891-1894; Tennessee state representative; Nashville city attorney
 Edward T. Seay (LL.B 1891), speaker of the Tennessee Senate 
 Jody Wagner (J.D. 1980), 12th Virginia Secretary of Finance
 Justin P. Wilson (J.D. 1970), lawyer, Tennessee state comptroller of the treasury

Other 
 James M. Anderson (J.D. 1966), former president and CEO of the Cincinnati Children's Hospital Medical Center 
 Paul S. Atkins (J.D. 1983), CEO of Patomak Global Partners LLC
 Thomas W. Beasley (J.D. 1973), co-founder of CoreCivic
 James W. Bradford (J.D. 1974), former CEO of AFG Industries
 Henry L. Brandon (J.D.), United States naval aviator, Corsair Fighter-Bomber Squadron VBF-82
 Thomas L. Cummings Sr. (J.D. 1915), 61st Mayor of Nashville
 Mark Dalton (J.D. 1975), attorney, CEO of the Tudor Investment Corporation; chairman of the board of trustees at Vanderbilt
 Mark L. Feidler (J.D. 1981), chairman of Equifax
 Mitch Glazier (J.D. 1991), chairman and CEO of the Recording Industry Association of America
 Justin Ishbia (J.D. 2004), businessman and philanthropist; Founding Partner, Shore Capital Partners, sits on Vanderbilt University Board of Trust. 
 Pauline LaFon Gore (LL.B. 1936), mother of former United States vice president Al Gore, political campaigner
 Dorsey B. Hardeman (LL.B), former executive director and commissioner of the Texas Water Commission
 Robert Selph Henry (LL.B 1910), vice president of the Association of American Railroads (1934–1958)
 John Jay Hooker (J.D. 1957), political figure
 Steven Machat (J.D. 1977), entertainment mogul 
 Jackson W. Moore (J.D. 1973), former executive chairman of Union Planters Bank and Regions Financial Corporation
 Mike McWherter (J.D. 1981), chairman of the board of First State Bank
 Yoo Myung-hee (J.D. 2002), minister for trade of South Korea
 K.C. Potter (J.D. 1964), academic administrator and LGBT rights activist
 Bill Purcell (J.D. 1979), 67th mayor of Nashville
 Maritza Sáenz Ryan (J.D. 1988), United States Army colonel, first female and hispanic head of the Department of Law at the United States Military Academy
 Clay Travis (J.D. 2004), American sports journalist, writer, television analyst, and the morning radio show host for nationwide Fox Sports Radio
 Darrin Williams (J.D. 1993), former politician, CEO of Southern Bancorp Inc.

Notable faculty

Current
 Lauren Benton, historian known for works on the history of empires, Nelson O. Tyrone, Jr. Professor of History and Professor of Law
James Blumstein, University Professor of Constitutional Law and Health Law and Policy
 Lisa Schultz Bressman, David Daniels Allen Distinguished Chair of Law, Professor of administrative law 
 Ellen Wright Clayton, Professor of Law, leader in the field of law and genomics, 2013 David Rall Medal winner
 Brian T. Fitzpatrick, Professor of Law, Complex Litigation, Civil Procedure, Visiting Professor at Harvard Law School
 Chris Guthrie, Dean, John Wade-Kent Syverud Professor of Law, expert on behavioral law and economics, dispute resolution, negotiation
 Kent A. Jordan, United States circuit judge of the United States Court of Appeals for the Third Circuit
 Jim Rossi, Associate Dean for Research, Judge D. L. Lansden Chair in Law, scholar of Energy Law and Administrative Law
 J. B. Ruhl, David Daniels Allen Distinguished Chair in Law, among the most cited U.S. academics in environmental law
 Paige Skiba, Professor of Law and Economics, and a leading scholar in the regulation of high-interest consumer loan industries
 Suzanna Sherry, author of numerous books on constitutional interpretive theory and casebooks on Civil Procedure and Federal Jurisdiction
 Ganesh Sitaraman, Professor of Law, Director, Program in Law and Government, Elizabeth Warren adviser, Center for American Progress senior Fellow
 W. Kip Viscusi, University Distinguished Professor of Law, Economics, and Management and the Co-Director of the Ph.D. Program in Law and Economics

Former
 Earl C. Arnold, author of Outlines of Suretyship and Guardianship, former Dean (1930–1945)
 Robert Barsky, Professor of Law, scholar of immigration and refugee law
 Rebecca Latham Brown, constitutional law theorist, former Allen Chair in Law
 Terry Calvani, anti-trust law scholar, former Commissioner of the U.S. Federal Trade Commission
 Jonathan Charney, former Lee S. and Charles A. Spier Professor, co-editor-in-chief of the American Journal of International Law
William Frierson Cooper, nominated to serve on the Confederate Supreme Court by Jefferson Davis; first Dean from 1874 to 1875
 Anne Coughlin, expert in criminal law, criminal procedure, feminist jurisprudence and law and humanities
 Jacob M. Dickinson, Professor of Law (1897–99), United States Secretary of War (1909–1911)
 James W. Ely Jr., Milton R. Underwood Professor of Law Emeritus and Professor of History Emeritus, recipient of the Brigham-Kanner Property Rights Prize
 Barry E. Friedman, authority on constitutional law, policing, criminal procedure, and federal courts, working at the intersections of law, politics and history
 Jefferson B. Fordham, former Professor of Law, 9th Dean of the University of Pennsylvania Law School
 William Ray Forrester, former Dean, Constitutional Law scholar
 Joel Gerber, former Chief Justice of the United States Tax Court
Horace Harmon Lurton (1844–1914), Associate Justice of the United States Supreme Court, Dean from 1905 until 1909
Jacob M. Dickinson, 44th United States Secretary of War, Professor of Law from 1897 to 1899 while he was an attorney for the Louisville and Nashville Railroad
 Harold G. Maier, expert in Private International Law, International Civil Litigation (retired in 2006)
Thomas H. Malone (1834–1906), Confederate veteran, judge, Dean of the Vanderbilt University Law School for two decades
 James Clark McReynolds (1862–1946), Associate Justice of the United States Supreme Court, served on the faculty before becoming part of President Theodore Roosevelt's Justice Department
 Vijay Padmanabhan, former attorney-adviser for the United States Department of State
 Lyman Ray Patterson, influential copyright scholar and historian, served as an assistant United States Attorney while teaching at Vanderbilt
 Robert K. Rasmussen, expert in bankruptcy and corporate reorganization, former Dean of the USC Gould School of Law
 Larry Soderquist, Professor of Law (1981–2005), director at Corporate and Securities Law Institute 
 Kent Syverud, former Garner Anthony Professor of Law, expert on complex litigation, insurance law, and civil procedure
 Christopher Yoo, professor (1999–2007), former director of Vanderbilt's Technology and Entertainment Law Program, among the most frequently cited scholars of technology law, media law and copyright

References

External links
Vanderbilt University Law School homepage

Vanderbilt University
Law schools in Tennessee
Educational institutions established in 1874
1874 establishments in Tennessee